Cahul is a Moldovan wine region. The southern wine zone of Moldova includes the territories of the Bugeac Plain and Moldova's south. These regions have similar drought affect, but differ in their soils and climate conditions. The conditions in the southern zone favor the production of red and sweet wines. The most famous wineries here are Comrat, Taraclia, Ciumai, and Trifești.

References

External links
www.vinmoldova.md - Basic Moldovan zones for growing grapes

Wine regions of Moldova